"Last Time in New York" is the third episode of the ninth season of the CBS sitcom How I Met Your Mother, and the 187th episode overall.

Plot
On Friday at 2:00 PM, 52 hours before the wedding, Lily discovers Ted's list of things he wants to do in New York before he moves to Chicago. She becomes frustrated that she is the only person who knows about his plans. As she goes through the items on the list, Lily makes Ted realize that his list is actually just proof of how much he loves New York. She notes that the only item on Ted's list that he has not accomplished is having one last scotch with Barney and forces Ted to admit that he has been avoiding Barney and Robin since the day he tried to help Robin find her locket at the carousel. Lily convinces Ted to say goodbye to all the bad things since the good things will always be waiting for him. At some point during their conversation, Lily and Robin reveal that they broke a 30-year-old Glen McKenna Ted reserved for his drink with Barney during a sword fight and tried faking whatever is left. When Lily discovers that an earlier sword fight by Ted and Marshall destroyed a special dress she was planning to wear at the rehearsal dinner, she punishes them, especially Marshall as his road trip with Daphne brings them to Wisconsin.

Meanwhile, Robin and Barney realize they have very little time together before their elderly relatives arrive for their wedding. Worried that the drive and passion in their relationship will fade away after they are married, they look for a place to have sex one last time. When they see Robin's great-grandparents are still ready to jump each other even after 60 years of marriage, they stop worrying that their relationship will become dull and argumentative and decide to face their relatives.

Ted finally decides to stop avoiding Barney and goes with a bottle and two glasses to meet Barney. Before Ted can offer the scotch, Barney reveals that he had seen Ted and Robin at the carousel where she had been looking for her missing locket.

Critical reception

Donna Bowman of The A.V. Club gave the episode an A− rating.

Max Nicholson of IGN gave the episode a 7.0/10 rating claiming it "included a funny and sweet subplot for Ted and Lily, and not much else."

Popculturology's Bill Kuchman said, "Between last week's episodes and "Last Time in New York," Season 9 of HIMYM has felt less than a tight storyline and more like a series of vignettes punctuated by heartstring-tugging closing scenes. ... This week's episode wrapped up with one of my favorite Lily moments in a long time."

References

External links

How I Met Your Mother (season 9) episodes
2013 American television episodes